The 2020–21 Maryland Terrapins men's basketball team represented the University of Maryland, College Park in the 2020–21 NCAA Division I men's basketball season. They were led by 10th-year head coach Mark Turgeon and play their home games at Xfinity Center in College Park, Maryland, as members of the Big Ten Conference. The Terrapins finished the season 17–14, 9–11 in Big Ten play to finish in a tie for eighth place. As the No. 8 seed in the Big Ten tournament, they defeated Michigan State in the second round before losing to Michigan in the quarterfinals. They received an at-large bid to the NCAA tournament as the No. 10 seed in the East region. The defeated UConn in the First Round before losing to Alabama in the Second Round. 

Following the season, Turgeon signed a three-year extension to remain head coach through 2026.

Previous season
The Terrapins finished the 2019–20 season 24–7, 14–6 in Big Ten play to finish in a three-way tie for first place. Their season ended following the cancellation of postseason tournaments due to the coronavirus pandemic.

Offseason

2020 recruiting class

Incoming transfers

Player departures

Preseason

Preseason watch lists

Roster

2021 recruit James Graham III, who officially signed with the Terps on National Signing Day, will graduate high school early and join the program for the 2020–21 season. 
Walk-on Connor Odom was removed from the team roster prior to the start of the season. No official reason has been reported.

Depth chart

Schedule and results
The team's game against Monmouth, scheduled for December 1, was canceled after Monmouth announced a positive COVID-19 test within its team. The game was replaced with a game against Towson  on December 1 before Towson also had a member of their team test positive for COVID-19 and was forced to cancel the game. In addition, games against George Mason and James Madison were likewise canceled due to COVID-19 issues. 

|-
!colspan=9 style=| Regular Season

  

|-
!colspan=9 style=|

|-
!colspan=9 style=|
|-

Rankings

*AP does not release post-NCAA Tournament rankings*Coaches did not release a Week 2 poll.

References

Maryland Terrapins men's basketball seasons
Maryland
Terra
Maryland